Alexandre Henri Goüin (25 January 1792, in Tours – 27 May 1872) was a French banker and politician.

Life 
Came from a banker family, he was member of the municipal council of Tours from 1820 on and president of the Tribunal and Chamber of Commerce of Tours.

He was deputy for the department of Indre-et-Loire (1831-1868), president of the General councils of Indre-et-Loire (1834-), minister of Commerce and Agriculture in the government of Louis-Philippe of France (1840), Vice president of Corps législatif and Senator of the Second Empire (1868-1870).

Goüin has director of Caisse générale du commerce et de l'industrie (1844-1848).

He was the father of Eugène Goüin and the uncle of Ernest Goüin.

See also
Hôtel Goüin
Minister of Commerce and Industry (France)
Ministry of Agriculture (France)

References

Further reading
Frederick Martin,Handbook of contemporary biography, 1870
HighWire Press,History of Political Economy, Volumes 5 à 6, Duke University Press, 1973

1792 births
1872 deaths
Businesspeople from Tours, France
Politicians from Tours, France
Orléanists
Party of Order politicians
Bonapartists
French Ministers of Agriculture and Commerce
Members of the 2nd Chamber of Deputies of the July Monarchy
Members of the 3rd Chamber of Deputies of the July Monarchy
Members of the 4th Chamber of Deputies of the July Monarchy
Members of the 5th Chamber of Deputies of the July Monarchy
Members of the 6th Chamber of Deputies of the July Monarchy
Members of the 7th Chamber of Deputies of the July Monarchy
Members of the 1848 Constituent Assembly
Members of the National Legislative Assembly of the French Second Republic
Members of the 1st Corps législatif of the Second French Empire
Members of the 2nd Corps législatif of the Second French Empire
Members of the 3rd Corps législatif of the Second French Empire
French Senators of the Second Empire
French bankers
Commandeurs of the Légion d'honneur